Barclay Coppock (January 4, 1839 – September 4, 1861), also spelled "Coppac", "Coppic", and "Coppoc", was a follower of John Brown and a Union Army soldier in the American Civil War. Along with his brother Edwin Coppock (June 30, 1835 – December 16, 1859), he participated in Brown's raid on Harpers Ferry.

Edwin and Barclay Coppock were born of Quaker parentage in Winona, Ohio, near the intensely abolitionist town of Salem. After their father died early in their lives, they were raised by John Butler, described as "a benevolent Quaker", who has left us his recollections of Edwin. In 1857 Edwin was expelled from the church, as he refused to give up dancing. As teenagers they moved to Springdale, Iowa, where their mother was living. It was here that they met John Brown as he passed through in early 1859, transporting people who had been enslaved in Missouri to freedom. That summer, the two boys bade their mother goodbye, despite her fears of the violence they would encounter, and traveled to Chambersburg, Pennsylvania, to meet Brown's growing army.

Edwin Coppock captured, tried, and hanged
For his participation in John Brown's raid on Harpers Ferry, Edwin was tried and convicted of treason, murder, and fomenting a slave insurrection, and was hanged in Charles Town, Virginia (since 1863, West Virginia), on December 16, 1859. He wrote to his uncle, Joshua Coppock, two days before his execution. The uncle went to Charles Town and brought Edwin's body  to Salem; the "rude coffin" in which it was transported is held by the Ohio History Connection at its Museum in Columbus.

The body was laid out three nights, with armed guard; the guard was to prevent anti-abolitionists from stealing the body to prevent the funeral. Attendance was described as "immense"; hundreds came for the funeral and to hear the "eulogistic speeches". The body was moved to City Hall. His remains were first buried in the Friends Burying Ground, New Garden, Ohio. Attendance at the burial was estimated to have been from two to three thousand.

A plaque was added much later.

Barclay Coppock, in the Union Army
Barclay, like Owen Brown and Francis Jackson Meriam, did not enter Harpers Ferry; they remained at the Kennedy Farm guarding the weapons. When it became clear that the raid was failing, they escaped northward, after much difficulty reaching  John Brown, Jr.'s house in Ashtabula County, Ohio.  Barclay continued to Canada, later returning to Springdale, Iowa, where his mother lived. On January 23, 1860, about three months after the Harpers Ferry raid, Iowa governor Samuel Kirkwood received from the governor of Virginia a requisition "for one Barclay Coppock, reputed to be a fugitive from the justice of Virginia". Kirkwood found the requisition deficient in legal form and returned it to Virginia. Barclay was gone to Canada by the time Kirkwood received the corrected papers.

He later returned to Ashtabula County, Ohio, where John Brown Junior lived, and where raiders Owen Brown and Francis Merriam were taking refuge. A newspaper story reports that they were all registered to vote there. Barclay, along with Owen, addressed a meeting the day of Hazlett's and Stevens' executions.

Barclay later joined the Union Army during the American Civil War and served as a recruiting officer. He was killed in action when Confederate sabotage derailed his train over the Platte River, an incident called the Platte Bridge Railroad Tragedy.

See also
 John Brown's raiders

References

Further reading (most recent first)

External links
Edwin Coppock memorial at Hope Cemetery

1839 births
1861 deaths
Brother duos
Union Army soldiers
People of Iowa in the American Civil War
Participants in John Brown's raid on Harpers Ferry
American expatriates in Canada
Union military personnel killed in the American Civil War
People executed in Charles Town, West Virginia
People executed by Virginia by hanging
1835 births
1859 deaths
American revolutionaries